María José is a Mexican telenovela produced by Juan Osorio for Televisa in 1995.

Claudia Ramírez and Arturo Peniche starred as protagonists, while Ana Patricia Rojo starred as main antagonist.

Plot 
María José is a beautiful and humble young woman who has had to work doing housework. His father Serafín is very ill and her mother Rosario, died long ago. Carlos Alberto is the only son of Raúl Almazán and Piedad and has always been a spoiled child.

Cast 
 
Claudia Ramírez as María José Reyes
Arturo Peniche as Carlos Alberto Almazán
Ana Patricia Rojo as Imperia Campuzano de la Cruz
María Victoria as Pachita
Ernesto Gómez Cruz as Serafín
Saby Kamalich as Piedad de Almazán
Rogelio Guerra as Raúl Almazán
Beatriz Aguirre as Teresa
Leonardo Daniel as Octavio Campuzano
Raquel Morell as Natalia de la Cruz de Campuzano
Anthony Álvarez as  El Tuercas
Leticia Perdigón as Esther
Roberto Ballesteros as Joel
Charly Valentino as Vivales
Daniel Zamora as Raúl
Óscar Morelli as Mauro
Olivia Collins as Dalila
Alejandro Aragón as Vicente
Lili Blanco as Felicia
Aurora Clavel as Mercedes "Meche"
Armando Araiza as Mateo
Héctor Soberón as Darío
Guillermo de Alvarado as Condorito
Isabel Martínez "La Tarabilla" as Cleta
Beatriz Monroy as Zoila
Claudio Brook as Rodrigo Almazán
Estela Barona as Rosario
Guadalupe Bolaños as Norma
Juan Cid as Tobías
Monserrat Gallosa as Rosa
Christel Klitbo as Adelita
Adriana Lavat as Susana Valtierra
Claudia Ortega as Tina
Juan Verduzco as Horacio
Esteban Franco as Jacinto
Sergio Neach as Rodrigo
Maty Huitrón as Dr. Juárez
Eduardo Cáceres as Saúl
Juan Antonio Gómez as Dr. Gil
Marco de Carlo as Dr. Rebolledo
Luis Guillermo Martell as Felipe
Nelson Velázquez as Ing. Ruiz
María José Cadenas as La Bebé
Roberto Molina as Dr. Molina
Maickol Segura as El Lombriz
Janet Pineda as Pilar
Luis Alberto Arteaga as El Púas
Ramón Menéndez as Justino
Alberto Díaz as Juan
Mónica Pablos as Luisa
Arturo Delgado as Captain Martínez
Carlos González as Detective Esparza
Mónica Dossetti as Carla
Mario Carballido as Paco
Julio Casado as Hugo
Sergio Morante as Leopoldo
Germán Blando as León
Juan Carlos Alcalá as Fernando
Fernando Castro as Teodoro
Yolanda Palacios as Aída
Ramiro Ramírez as El Araña
Julio Bracho as Agent Ojeda
María Luisa Coronel as Emma
Salvador González as Benito José
Fabiola Campomanes as Linda
Luisa Acosta as Eugenia
Carmelina Encinas as Lourdes
Olivares as Romualdo
Germán Montalvo as Montalvo
Rosángela Balbó
Simone Brook
Jesús Carrasco
Helio Castillos
María Duval
José Luis Duval
Azucena Hernández
Víctor Nassry
Jorge Pais
Enrike Palma
José Puga
Lillyan Tapia
Raúl Valerio
Angélica Zamora
Juan de la Loza

Awards

References

External links

1995 telenovelas
Mexican telenovelas
1995 Mexican television series debuts
1995 Mexican television series endings
Spanish-language telenovelas
Television shows set in Mexico
Televisa telenovelas